Jason Brian Carter (born 23 September 1960) is an English actor, best known for his role as Ranger Marcus Cole on the science fiction television series Babylon 5.

Born in Ealing, London and brought up in Gainsborough, a small market-town in Lincolnshire, Carter appeared on stage since he was a child. Advised to pursue a career in rubber technology, Carter opted instead for three years at London Academy of Music and Dramatic Art. In 1982, he landed his first television role on BBC2’s long-running Jackanory Playhouse (1965–1996) as Hawkwing. He has appeared in numerous television series including Viper, Beverly Hills, 90210, 3rd Rock from the Sun, Charmed, Angel and Babylon 5.

In 1988, he performed on London's West End (at the Phoenix Theatre, London) with James Wilby, Patrick Barlow, Sarah Berger, Paul Mooney and John Gordon Sinclair in The Common Pursuit a play by Simon Gray.

He also played the hedgehog, Hans, in an episode of the television series The Storyteller in 1987. In 2004, Carter loaned his voice briefly to the James Bond video game GoldenEye: Rogue Agent, in the role of Bond. He also appeared in the film The Duel as William, and in the 2016 miniseries remake of Roots as Viscount Shaw.

Filmography

King David (1985) - Solomon
Demon Under Glass (2002) - Simon Molinar
 The Final Curtain (2007) – Eamon,
 Vampire (2010) - Simon, a horror-thriller drama by Jon Cunningham
 The Dead Matter (2010) - Ian McCallister, Midnight Syndicate Films 
Babylon 5 (1995-1996) - Marcus Cole

References

External links
 

1960 births
Living people
English male television actors
English male voice actors
Alumni of the London Academy of Music and Dramatic Art
Male actors from London
People from Ealing
Actors from Lincolnshire
People from Gainsborough, Lincolnshire
20th-century English male actors
21st-century English male actors